Pipe tree is a common name for several plants used in making pipe stems and may refer to:

Philadelphus
Syringa